The Havill Plate was an annual rugby union knock-out competition organised by the Devon Rugby Football Union.  It was first introduced during the 1971–72 season for clubs that were knocked out of the first round of the Devon Senior Cup with Ilfracombe being the first winners. When the Devon Junior Cup was reintroduced for the 1986–87 season the plate would expand to include teams knocked out of the early rounds of the Junior Cup, until the plate was discontinued after the 1999 final. The Devon RFU have reintroduced similar competitions in recent years although most have been discontinued due to a lack of interest.

Devon Havill Plate winners

Number of wins
Exmouth (3)
Ilfracombe (3)
Paignton (2)
Wessex (2)
Bideford (1)
Crediton (1)
Dartmouth (1)
Honiton (1)
Ivybridge (1)
Kingsbridge (1)
Newton Abbot (1)
Okehampton (1)
Old Technicians (1)
Plymouth Civil Service (1)
Salcombe (1)
Sidmouth (1)
Tavistock (1)
Teignmouth (1)
Tiverton (1)
Topsham (1)
Torrington (1)
Totnes (1)

See also
 Devon RFU
 Devon Senior Cup
 Devon Intermediate Cup
 Devon Junior Cup
 David Butt Memorial Trophy
 English rugby union system
 Rugby union in England

References

External links
 Devon RFU

Recurring sporting events established in 1972
Rugby union cup competitions in England
Rugby union in Devon
1972 establishments in England
2000 disestablishments in England
Recurring sporting events disestablished in 2000